That's Good is a 1919 American silent comedy film directed by Harry L. Franklin and starring Hale Hamilton, Stella Gray, and Herbert Prior. It was released on March 19, 1919.

Cast list
 Hale Hamilton as Marcellus Starr
 Stella Gray as Josephine Pollock
 Herbert Prior as Barrett Prentice
 James Duffy as Ed Freeze
 Lewis Morrison as Ben Goetting
 Marjorie Yeager as Alice
 James McAndless as Jim the store clerk

References

American silent feature films
American black-and-white films
Films based on short fiction
Films directed by Harry L. Franklin
Metro Pictures films
Silent American comedy films
1919 comedy films
1919 films
1910s English-language films
1910s American films